"I Could Get Used to You" is a song written by J.P. Pennington and Sonny LeMaire, and recorded by American country music group Exile.  It was released in November 1985 as the second single from the album Hang On to Your Heart.  The song was the seventh number one country hit for Exile.  The single went to number one for one week and spent a total of fourteen weeks on the country chart.

Chart performance

References

1985 singles
Exile (American band) songs
Songs written by J.P. Pennington
Song recordings produced by Buddy Killen
Epic Records singles
1985 songs
Songs written by Sonny LeMaire